Jay and the Americans are an American rock group who formed in the late 1950s. Their initial line-up consisted of John "Jay" Traynor, Howard Kane (born Howard Kirschenbaum), Kenny Vance (born Kenneth Rosenberg) and Sandy Deanne (born Sandy Yaguda), though their greatest success on the charts came after Traynor had been replaced as lead singer by Jay Black.

Biography

Early years
They were discovered while performing in student venues at New York University in the late 1950s. They auditioned for Leiber and Stoller, who gave the group its name.

Career pinnacle
Soon they signed with United Artists Records. With Jay Traynor singing lead, they first hit the Billboard charts in 1962 with the tune "She Cried", which reached #5 (later covered by The Shangri-Las, Aerosmith, and others). The next two singles did not fare as well, and Traynor left the group. Empires' guitarist Marty Sanders (né Kupersmith) joined the group. He brought David Black (né Blatt) of "The Empires" in to take Traynor's place (after David first agreed to adopt the name Jay Black), and Black sang lead for the rest of the group's major hits.

They recorded "Only in America", a song originally meant for The Drifters. Other notable hits for Jay and the Americans were "Come a Little Bit Closer" in 1964, which hit #3, and "Cara Mia" in 1965, which hit #4. They also recorded a commercial for H.I.S. Slacks and a public service announcement for the Ad Council, featuring a backing track by Brian Wilson and Phil Spector. Two tracks from this era later found favor with the Northern Soul crowd: "Got Hung Up Along The Way" and "Living Above Your Head".

In 1966, the group was featured in the Universal comedy film, Wild Wild Winter, singing "Two of a Kind" at the film's finale, with surf band The Astronauts depicted as providing backup instrumentals. As of February 2017, the song has been released only on the 1966 soundtrack LP.

In 1969, they recorded an album of their favorite oldies called Sands of Time, which included "This Magic Moment", which was originally done by the Drifters. The single went to #6 in early 1969. It sold over one million copies, and was awarded a gold disc by the R.I.A.A. in May 1969. "This Magic Moment" was the last top ten record for Jay and the Americans, although a follow-up album, Wax Museum, in January 1970, did yield the #19 hit single  "Walkin' In The Rain", first recorded by The Ronettes. Their next singles failed to chart, and the band grew apart, but the demand for appearances remained. (Around the same time the band recorded "This Magic Moment", Jay and the Americans member Sandy Yaguda produced a Long Island teen sextet called The Tuneful Trolley. Their late-1968 Capitol LP, Island In The Sky — a hybrid of Beach Boys and Beatlesque psych-pop—was reissued in 2008 in the UK on Now Sounds.) From 1970 to 1971 Jay and the Americans' touring band included Walter Becker and Donald Fagen (of later Steely Dan fame) on backup bass guitar and electric organ.

Split
The group split in 1973. All of the members moved on to solo musical careers, with the exception of Jay Black, who continued to perform as "Jay and the Americans", using a variety of musicians. In 2001, he was featured in the PBS special Rock, Rhythm, and Doo Wop as "Jay Black & The Americans".

The original version of "Cara Mia" went to #1 in the Netherlands when it was re-released in 1980.

Sale of the band name and "reunion"

In 2006, Jay Black filed for bankruptcy due to gambling debts, and his ownership of the name "Jay & The Americans" was sold by the bankruptcy trustee to Sandy Deanne (Yaguda), Black's former bandmate and original member of Jay & The Americans, for $100,000.  With the name purchase, former members Deanne, Howard Kane, and Marty Sanders reunited, and recruited a sound-alike singer from Chicago, coincidentally nicknamed "Jay."  Thus, John "Jay" Reincke became the third "Jay" and the band returned to playing both national and international music venues. Their show covers the history of Jay and The Americans, acknowledging all three Jays and featuring all of the top hits in their original arrangements.

Until 2017, David Blatt continued to tour under his stage name, "Jay Black". In a 2014 interview, he announced that he had Alzheimer's; he continued to perform until 2017.  Kenny Vance is currently the lead singer of Kenny Vance and the Planotones, a neo-doo wop band that he formed in the 1970s. After leaving the group, John Traynor recorded a handful of songs on the Coral label, including "I Rise, I Fall" in 1964. None were hits, but "I Rise, I Fall" became a minor hit for Johnny Tillotson. The label billed Traynor as "JAY formerly of Jay and the Americans." Traynor toured with Jay Siegel's Tokens until shortly before his death on January 2, 2014.

Black died on October 22, 2021. In a statement, Jay and the Americans acknowledged that Black and the rest of the group had experienced "very contentious times" but that they respected the success that they achieved with Black as their lead singer.

Awards and recognition
The group was inducted into the Vocal Group Hall of Fame in 2002.

Members

Current members
Sandy Deanne - vocals (1960–1973, 2006–present)
Howard Kane - vocals (1960–1973, 2006–present)
Marty Sanders - guitar, vocals (1962-1973, 2006–present)
Jay Reincke - lead vocals (2006–present)
Rick Van Horn - drummer (2013-present)

Former members
Kenny Vance - vocals (1960–1973)
Jay Traynor - lead vocals (1960-1962) (died 2014)
Jay Black - lead vocals (1962-2006) (died 2021)
Brian Cano - drums (1969-2007)

Discography
Key: Billboard (BB), Cashbox (CB), and RPM charts peak positions

Albums

Compilation albums

Singles

References

External links
 Jay Black's website 
 Jay and the Americans website
 'Jay and The Americans' Vocal Group Hall of Fame Page
 History of Jay and the Americans
 Descriptions of and lyrics for the songs on the best-of compilation Come a Little Bit Closer
 
 
 Singing "Two of a Kind" in Wild Wild Winter

Rock music groups from New York (state)
Musical groups established in 1960
Musical groups from Queens, New York
American soul musical groups
1960 establishments in New York City